Adwoa is a given name used for women born on Monday in Western Africa, particularly Ghana and some parts of Togo, southern Benin and Ivory Coast. Day names are a cultural practice of the Akan people of Ghana and the Ivory Coast.  Although some might believe it is mostly practiced by Ashanti people,  it is actually practiced by all Akan (i.e. all the various Akan subgroups) people who follow traditional customs.  People born on particular days are supposed to exhibit the characteristics or attributes and philosophy, associated with the days. Adwoa has the appellation Badwo or Akoto meaning peace. Thus, females named Adwoa are supposed to be peaceful.

Origin and meaning of Adwoa 
In the Akan culture, day names are known to be derived from deities. Adwoa  is originated from Koyayuda and from the Lord of Life Firmament deity of the day Monday. Females born on Monday are known to be calm, peacemakers and protectors. They tend to be nurturing and achieve a balance between strength and compassion.

Female variants of Adwoa 
Day names in Ghana have varying spellings. This is so because of the various Akan subgroups. Each Akan subgroup has a similar or different spelling for the day name to other Akan subgroups. Adwoa is spelt Adwoa by the Akuapem and Ashanti subgroups while the Fante subgroup spell it as Adjoa, Ajua, or Ajuba.

Male version of Adwoa 
In the Akan culture and other local cultures in Ghana, day names come in pairs for males and females. The variant of the name used for a male child born on Monday Kwadwo.

Notable women named Adwoa
Most Ghanaian children have their cultural names in combination with their English or Christian names. Some notable people with such names are: 
 Adwoa Ansah-Brew (GEN Z), Musical Artist and Performer (East Coast Rockstar)
 Adwoa Aboah (born 1992), British model and activist
 Adjoa Andoh (born 1963), British actress
 Adwoa Smart (born 1971), Ghanaian actress
 Adjoa Bayor (born 1979), Ghanaian footballer
 Adwoa Yamoah (born 1986), Canadian cheerleader

References

External links
Adjua page from Traces of the Trade site

Society of Ghana
Akan given names
Feminine given names